September Song was a British bittersweet comedy-drama series, originally broadcast on the ITV channel in the United Kingdom. The drama unfolded over three series broadcast from 1 March 1993 to 21 March 1995 and starred comedian and actor Russ Abbot, in one of his first 'straight' television roles, as recently widowed ex-teacher Ted Fenwick, opposite Michael Williams as Billy Balsam, an old school comedian and performer and longtime friend of Ted.

References

External links
 

British comedy-drama television shows
1993 British television series debuts
1995 British television series endings
1990s British comedy-drama television series
ITV television dramas
Television series by ITV Studios
Television shows produced by Granada Television
English-language television shows
Television shows set in England